Lyubov Mikhailovna Ovcharova (born 23 October 1995) is a Russian freestyle wrestler. She won the silver medal in the women's 59 kg event at the 2019 World Wrestling Championships held in Nur-Sultan, Kazakhstan. In 2021, she competed at the 2020 Summer Olympics in Tokyo, Japan.

Career 

At the 2017 European U23 Wrestling Championship held in Szombathely, Hungary, she won the gold medal in the women's 60 kg event. At the 2017 European Wrestling Championships held in Novi Sad, Serbia, she also won the gold medal in the women's 60 kg event. In the final, she defeated Anastasija Grigorjeva of Latvia. In that same year, she also competed in the women's freestyle 60 kg event at the 2017 World Wrestling Championships held in Paris, France.

At the 2020 European Wrestling Championships held in Rome, Italy, she won one of the bronze medals in the women's 59 kg event. In her bronze medal match she defeated Elif Yanık of Turkey. In the same year, she also won one of the bronze medals in the women's 62 kg event at the 2020 Individual Wrestling World Cup held in Belgrade, Serbia.

In March 2021, she competed at the European Qualification Tournament in Budapest, Hungary hoping to qualify for the 2020 Summer Olympics in Tokyo, Japan. She was eliminated in her first match by Kriszta Incze of Romania. In April 2021, she competed in the 65 kg event at the European Wrestling Championships in Warsaw, Poland. In May 2021, she qualified at the World Olympic Qualification Tournament in Sofia, Bulgaria to compete at the 2020 Summer Olympics. A month later, she won one of the bronze medals in her event at the 2021 Poland Open held in Warsaw, Poland.

In August 2021, she lost her bronze medal match against Taybe Yusein of Bulgaria in the women's 62 kg event at the 2020 Summer Olympics in Tokyo, Japan.

Major results

References

External links 
 

Living people
1995 births
Russian female sport wrestlers
World Wrestling Championships medalists
European Wrestling Championships medalists
Wrestlers at the 2020 Summer Olympics
Olympic wrestlers of Russia
21st-century Russian women